The Squid is the name of two different villains in DC Comics.

Publication history
The first Squid debuted in Detective Comics #497 (December 1980) and was created by Gerry Conway and Don Newton.

The second Squid debuted in Adventure Comics #490 (February 1982) and was created by E. Nelson Bridwell and Carmine Infantino.

Fictional character biography

Lawrence Loman

Lawrence Loman (a.k.a. Clement Carp) is a crime lord and master criminal in Gotham City. He and his gang stole a satchel full of important documents that Batman eventually recovers. Batman is wounded in the process, and the Squid trails him and tries to finish the job without success.

Following the fall of Rupert Thorne and Tony Falco, he was poised to fill the vacuum left by Rupert Thorne and Tony Falco. He sets up a hideout in an old warehouse near the piers. He also was able to capture a giant squid which he named "Gertrude", which he kept in a huge aquarium in his hideout, usually feeding his foes to it. In an attempt to gain control of the Gotham underworld, he and his crew succeeded in capturing Batman and feeding him to Gertude. Batman was able to barely escape from the tank with his life. Eventually the villain Killer Croc (who was once a part of the Squid's gang) kills the Squid by shooting him from a rooftop.

In Post-Crisis continuity (as seen in 52), the Squid returned and was one of the crime bosses sought out/captured by Bruno Mannheim of the Intergang. Most of the bosses refused to join Intergang and were killed for that, but the Squid's final fate was unknown.

In The New 52 timeline, the Squid is re-established with a different appearance. Once again, he has a pet giant squid (who is also named Gertrude) which he uses to dispatch his foes. He was seen peddling a new drug called "Icarus" throughout the streets of Chinatown.

Unnamed alien

The second character called "The Squid" is an alien who arrived on Earth with Abyss to commit a string of robberies. They start in Fairfax which was home to Chris King and Vicki Grant. Chris and Vicki used their H-Dials to combat Squid and Abyss where they ended up defeating them. Squid tried to flee using one of Abyss's portals to return to his homeworld, but the Abyss was disoriented at the time, and sent the Squid to someplace else, the precise details unknown even to Abyss himself.

In The New 52 (a reboot of the DC Comics universe), Squid is shown as a prisoner of Ex Nihilo. Squid escapes from his cage and agrees that he will help deal with Ex Nihilo's problems merely on principle, despite his great disdain for his "captor". When Nelson Jent wonders what his next move will be, Squid infiltrates the hospital and kills Darren Hirsch. Sensing something is wrong, Nelson heads to the phone booth and turns into Iron Snail. Upon arriving at the hospital, Nelson ends up fighting Squid in the hospital. Upon feeling his powers failing, Iron Snail escapes into an alley and escapes in a cab as Nelson. Meanwhile, Squid returns to the hospital and pays a visit to Dr. Wald (Ex Nihilo's alter-ego), who is hearing over the phone from Vernon Boyne that Nelson escaped in a cab. Squid explains that the snail-man was not quite what he seemed. Dr. Wald has Vernon Boyne tail him. Before leaving, the Squid warns that whatever is causing the string of comas is coming back, and that Squid needs it to come back.

Ex Nihilo and Squid have each started to seek out a specific man to fill out the emptiness. When Nelson Jent (in the form of Baroness Resin) and Manteau arrive at Mr. King's apartment, they run into Ex Nihilo and Squad as they witness the arrival of Abyss.

It was revealed that Ex Nihilo was the one who rescued Squid from falling through half-formed worlds and ephemeral realities to bring Abyss to them. Ex Nihilo tries to merge with Abyss which doesn't work. Baroness Resin and Manteau try to find a way to attack Abyss where Manteau ends up throwing a chair at Abyss making him disappear. Squid then knocks out Manteau as Baroness Resin regresses back to Nelson Jent. As Squid drags Manteau away, Ex Nihilo reveals her true identity as Dr. Wald to Nelson as she stated that she has been understanding the nature of magic for thirty years trying to find a way to bring Abyss to her. Squid then shoots ink onto Nelson's face as Dr. Wald is shown to have an H-Dial. After Dr. Wald and Squid escape, Nelson has survived Squid's ink attack and must find a way to rescue Manteau from Ex Nihilo. Manteau then wakes up strapped to a gurney in Ex Nihilo's laboratory where Ex Nihilo demands to know from Manteau on what she knows about Abyss despite Squid stating that she might not know about Abyss. Ex Nihilo then turns her attention towards Manteau's H-Dial wanting to know how it works. Nelson watches Abyss' destructiveness on the TV, recalling an old quotation: "Gaze long into an abyss, and the abyss also gazes into you". Suddenly, a new hero appears, obviously a creation of the H-Dial. From behind him, Nelson is startled to hear the Squid's voice. Squid points out that there is a portion of that quote that is too often left out: one who fights with monsters should see that he doesn't become a monster himself. The hero that is on the scene now is one such monster he claims. He admits that his ink was not poisonous back at the hotel. He let Nelson live because he regrets killing Darren. He got the address from Manteau's torture session. He came looking for help. He has been wounded by Abyss and Ex Nihilo has refused to help him. All he ever wanted was to go home and maybe, Nelson is the kind of man who would help him do that. Squid tells Nelson that his race were herders and wranglers of nothingness in a region called Unplace until he stumbled upon Abyss. Squid tells Nelson that Ex Nihilo must be stopped before she angers Abyss even further. Nelson tells Squid that they first must rescue Manteau from Vernon Boyne's men. Squid helps to free Manteau as he is shot in the back by Vernon. Nelson uses a hammer to knock out Vernon as he helps Manteau and Squid (who is leaning on them for support) to escape. Meanwhile, Ex Nihilo confronts Abyss where she desperately shouts and tries to convince it to join her. Abyss shows Ex Nihilo that Squid is with Manteau and Nelson (who is in the form of one of his heroes) as Ex Nihilo leaps into Abyss to pursue them.

In a makeshift costume, Nelson Jent helps Squid rescue Manteau. Not wanting to be controlled by Ex Nihilo, Abyss leaves causing Ex Nihilo to face them alone. As a nullomancer though, she has control over the holes of nothingness that permeate the Squid's body since his last encounter with Abyss and he urges Nelson and Manteau to escape and fix their dial while he sacrifices himself. When Abyss returned to Littleford, Ex Nihilo has moved on leaving Squid in a near-death state. As Nelson in the form of Cock-a-Hoop fights Abyss, Squid watches and explains that when disoriented, the smaller nothings are more easily controlled by Hairbringer and that Cock-a-Hoop should team with her to send those nothings back to Abyss. Squid then passes away following Abyss' defeat.

Powers and abilities
The second Squid can project deadly ink from his fingertips. In The New 52, Squid can create a wide assortment of chemical "inks" from his fingertips.

See also
 List of Batman family enemies

References

External links
 Squid II at Comic Vine
 Squid II at Comic Vine
 

DC Comics aliens
Comics characters introduced in 1980
Characters created by Gerry Conway
Characters created by Carmine Infantino
DC Comics extraterrestrial supervillains
Fictional gangsters